Sarah-Quita Offringa (born 4 July 1991) is an Aruban professional sailor. She competed in the PWA World Tour windsurfing competition. In 2011 following back to back 2010/2011 PWA Women's Freestyle World Championship titles wins together with winning the 2011 PWA Slalom World Championship she was nominated by the International Sailing Federation for the ISAF World Sailor of the Year Awards.

References

External links
 
 Sarah-Quita Offringa at PWA World Tour
 

1991 births
Living people
Female windsurfers
Aruban female sailors (sport)
Dutch female sailors (sport)
People from Oranjestad, Aruba